ARA Punta Alta (Q-63) is a multipurpose auxiliary ship of the Argentine Navy, built in the Curtis Bay Shipyard, United States, in 1964; transferred to Argentina in 2000, she is based at Puerto Belgrano. The vessel is named after the Argentine city of Punta Alta, which is close to Puerto Belgrano, and is the second Argentine naval ship with this name.

Design 

Punta Alta is a multipurpose ship specialized in buoy maintenance, built at the US Coast Guard shipyard, Curtis Bay, United States. Her hull is specially designed for these tasks, being highly manoeuvrable thanks to its two variable-pitch propellers, twin rudders, and bow thruster. She has a metal hull and superstructure, and a single mast and funnel.

It is powered by two 16-cylinder V, 900 HP, “Caterpillar” D398 marine diesel engines  driving two propellers; and two bow thrusters. It also carries two 100 kW GM diesel generators, and two cranes with 10 ton and 5 ton lifting capacity.

It carries an aluminium hull launch powered by a 130 HP engine and equipped with communications and sounding equipment.

History 

The buoy tender Red Birch was commissioned by the US Coast Guard in 1964, and served with that service until decommissioned in 2000; and transferred to Argentina. She was commissioned in the same year by the Argentine Navy as Punta Alta with pennant number Q-63; and was assigned to the Puerto Belgrano Naval Base, which is still its homeport.

See also 
 List of active Argentine Navy ships

References

Notes

Bibliography

Other sources

Further reading 

 

Auxiliary ships of Argentina
Punta Alta
Ships built in Maryland
1964 ships